Lesbian, gay, bisexual and transgender (LGBTQ) rights are heavily suppressed in Bangladesh. Due to the conservative attitudes in Bangladeshi society, negative views of homosexuals are very high. Homosexuality is illegal under Bangladeshi law, which is inherited from the colonial British Indian Government's Section 377 of 1860. According to the law, the punishment for engaging in same-sex sexual activities is imprisonment. It is dangerous for those who identify as homosexuals to openly come out in society because of social rejection, hate or assault.

Legality of same-sex sexual activity
Section 377 ("Unnatural offences") of the Penal Code forbids anal and oral sex, regardless of the gender and sexual orientation of the participants:
 The ambit of Section 377 extends to any sexual union involving penile insertion. Thus, even consensual heterosexual acts such as fellatio and anal penetration may be punishable under this law.

In 2009 and 2013, the Bangladeshi Parliament refused to overturn Section 377.

Recognition of same-sex relationships
Bangladeshi law does not recognise same-sex relationship, civil unions, as well as any kind of domestic partnership for couples of the same sex. Bangladeshi society does not support these either. Consensual romantic relationship and marriage between the same sex is supported, though social conservatism is an impediment in this context (society is less supportive) as culturally society is based on 'marriage arranged by guardian' system.

On 23 July 2013, a lesbian couple was arrested for marrying in secret. Shibronty Roy Puja, a 16-year-old Hindu, and Sanjida Akter, 21-year-old Muslim, fled their town for Dhaka, the capital, and got married in a Hindu ceremony. They were then arrested and threatened with life imprisonment. Similarly, another lesbian couple was arrested in October 2013 for their relationship. One member of the couple was described as having short hair and identified as the husband. The police had them take sex identification tests, and the doctors stated they were both females. The case was filed under Section 209, which is about unsocial activities.

Adoption and family planning
There is no legal route for adoption for same-sex couples in Bangladesh.

History

Since the birth of the country, homosexuality was never defined by anyone, nor was there any incident or record that it existed in society. No writer had written about homosexuality, as it was a huge taboo among Bengalis. Any writing regarding it was homophobic. Homosexuality was seen in some brothels in the 1980s, though at that time no one in Bengali used the word. Instead, the word sodomy (in Bengali: payukam or 'anal sex') was used to indicate homosexuality. There were some homosexual prostitutes at that time, which was published in major Bengali-language newspapers.

Bangladesh is a country where friendships between same-sex individuals are allowed by society; but physical contact between persons of opposite is not. In the context of homosexuality, it is still taboo in the whole Bangladesh and most of the Bangladeshi people do not know the real meaning of it. As homosexuality is taboo (the word is also taboo) and secret, the society is in the dark about the original definition of it. Some people consider same-sex sexual acts in the same way that "sodomy" was viewed in the British colonial era; they do not possess the general idea of same gender romance, are unaware of it, and only see friendship (or no sexuality) between people of the same gender. Bangladeshis also disallow talking with strangers of opposite genders. Bangladeshi literature has a rich community of writers and the top authors have never promoted homosexuality though they have promoted heterosexual romance.

Formal laws against homosexuality were imposed by the British when Bangladesh was a part of British India; they were enacted in 1860 through the Indian Penal Code and went into effect in 1862. These laws were carried over into the Pakistan Penal Code following the partition of India in 1947, and continue to be part of Bangladesh's legal code since its independence from Pakistan in 1971. In 2010s a magazine named Roopbaan was published, the magazine was for general readers which publicized homosexuality, before it no Bangladeshi local magazine was seen which talked on the behalf of homosexuality.

Gender identity and expression
On 11 November 2013, hijras were recognized as a separate gender by the Bangladeshi Government in a cabinet meeting chaired by Prime Minister Sheikh Hasina Wazed. Along with males and females, hijras will be identified as a separate gender on official documents. A survey by the Ministry of Social Welfare showed that as of 2013, there are 10,000 registered hijras in the country. Despite this, Bangladesh does not have policies outlining measures individuals must undergo to legally change their gender on their official documents, nor is there clarity about who may qualify as a hijra. 

In December 2014, the Ministry of Social Welfare invited hijras to apply for government employment. In January 2015, the Ministry of Health issued a memorandum requesting that "necessary steps are taken to identify hijras by conducting thorough medical check-ups". These check-ups resulted in hijras having to publicly strip naked and have their genitals touched. Photographs of these check-ups were later released to the media who then claimed that hijras are "really men". In July 2015, after a hijra witnessed the murder of a secular blogger, and successfully helped in the arrest of the perpetrators, who were Islamic radicals, the Bangladeshi government announced plans to recruit and enlist hijras as traffic police. In April 2019, it was reported that Bangladesh will allow the "hijra" to vote under their proper gender identity, as officials have introduced "hijra" as a third gender option on voting forms for the first time.

Social attitude
Although public display of affection between friends of the same gender in Bangladesh is commonly approved and does not raise any controversies, there appears to be a strong objection towards homosexuality as such. This hostile attitude results from conservative culture of the country, with Islam being professed by approximately 90% of the population. Society's miscreants can involve in mob justice as they also consider homosexuality 'immoral' and 'abnormal' and also a social crime.

In 2003, Dr. Gary Dowsett, an Australian professor, published a report titled A Review of Knowledge About the Sexual Networks and Behaviours of Men Who Have Sex with Men in Asia as part of a study on how the AIDS pandemic is impacting the nation. The bulk of the report focused on male prostitution, but it did generate some public discussion about LGBT issues, with Indian movies and water poisoning through arsenic being blamed for making homosexuality more common. In reply, some people criticised these negative viewpoints as being unsound scientifically and based on prejudice.

In 2011, a research-based engagement with a school of public health at a university in Bangladesh had aimed to raise public debate on sexuality and rights in a very sensitive political context. By bringing together stakeholders, including members of sexual minorities, academicians, service providers, media, policy makers and advocacy organizations, the research engagement worked to bring visibility to hidden and stigmatised sexuality and rights issues. Critical steps towards visibility for sexual minorities include creating safe spaces for meeting, developing learning materials for university students and engaging with legal rights groups.

Bangladesh opened its first religious school for transgender people in Dhaka. More than 150 students were initially expected to study Islamic and vocational subjects for free. Classes started from 7 November 2020. There was no age limit set for the enrollment of students.

Public opinion
A 2017-2020 World Values Survey showed that 77.3% of Bangladeshis would not accept a homosexual neighbour, compared to 19.5% that would. The same survey found that 89.4% of Bangladeshis said homosexuality was unjustifiable, compared to just 0.2% who said it was. The same survey also found that 75.4% of Bangladeshis disagreed with the statement "homosexual couples are as good parents as other couples", while 6.5% agreed.

A 2013 Gallup poll showed that 28% of Bangladeshis thought that the area they lived in was not a good place for homosexuals, while 19% thought it was.

Bangladeshi LGBT organisations
The first attempt to create an LGBT organisation in Bangladesh came in 1999, when a man called Rengyu, described as a "middle-aged foreign-educated guy from an indigenous tribe", opened the first online group for Bangladeshi gay people, called Gay Bangladesh, which was moderate by a man named Abrar. It drew over 1,000 members; however, after Rengyu's death, its activity slowed down and the group itself became neglected. In 2002, two other online groups appeared on the Yahoo! portal: Teen Gay Bangladesh (TGB) operated by Abrar, and Boys Only Bangladesh. Both groups were deleted by Yahoo! authorities in December 2002, and after several restarts and name changes, TGB formed under new name Bangladesh Gay Boys (BGB) and Boys Only Bangladesh, now called Boys of Bangladesh (BoB). The group is the largest network for Bangladeshi gay men, organising numerous LGBT rights-related events in Dhaka since 2009. Boys of Bangladesh aims at building a gay community in the country and repealing Section 377.

In January 2014, Bangladesh's first LGBT magazine was published. The magazine is named Roopbaan after a Bengali folk character who represents the power of love.

Since 2014, every year at the beginning of the Bengali new year on 14 April, a Pride event called Rainbow Rally had been organised in Dhaka. After threats, the 2016 event had to be cancelled. In 2014, Bangladesh held its first Hijra parade. On 25 April 2016, Xulhaz Mannan, founder of Roopbaan magazine and organiser of the Rainbow Rally, was killed in his apartment together with a friend.

Many people have turned to Boys of Bangladesh to discuss their feelings and connect with similar individuals who face the same problems they do. The forum has not registered as an organisation because they do not want to associate themselves with the MSM (men who have sex with men) label. They do not wish to fall under the umbrella of being MSMs because they view it as a degrading term. The group's coordinator has stated that the MSM label is only about men having sex with other men. It is considered more than that. The online forum arranges events for gay men to meet and socialise. Not all people have access to their group because they do not have access to the internet. Nonetheless, BoB has more than 2,000 registered members, including Ph.D. holders and doctors.

The UN Population Fund and several NGOs have put pressure on Bangladesh to address issues such as LGBT rights and sexuality education. These issues were discussed at the Sixth Asian and Pacific Population Conference which began on 16 September 2013. Bangladesh altogether opposed the UNFPA's idea to support LGBT rights. Bangladesh's permanent representative to the UN, Abulkalam Abdul Momen, said that adopting such policies would go against the country's social norms.

In September 2014, at the International Conference on Population Development, Bangladesh refused the idea of providing rights to the LGBT community. Abdul Momen made similar comments in regards to the situation as he did the previous year at the Sixth Asian and Pacific Population Conference. He was quoted saying that, like other Muslim or even Christian countries, Bangladesh does not support LGBT rights because it does not represent their values.

In April 2016, LGBT activist Xulhaz Mannan, founder and publisher of Roopbaan, the only magazine for the LGBT community in Bangladesh, was killed along with Mahbub Rabbi Tonoy, another LGBT activist. Ansar-al-Islam, an Al-Qaeda-linked group, claimed responsibility for the murders stating as he had himself confirmed his sexuality, he needed to be killed according to shariah law. In May 2019, eight extremists were charged by Bangladesh police for the murders. Four of the eight are in custody and police are still searching for the others.

Human rights reports

2017 United States Department of State report
In 2017, the United States Department of State reported the following, concerning the status of LGBT rights in Bangladesh:
 "The most significant human rights issues included: extrajudicial killings, torture, arbitrary or unlawful detentions, and forced disappearances by government security forces; restrictions on civil liberties, including freedom of speech, press, and the activities of non-governmental organizations (NGOs); a lack of freedom to participate in the political process, corruption, violence, and discrimination based on gender, religious affiliation, caste, tribe, including indigenous persons, and sexual orientation and gender identity also persisted and, in part, due to a lack of accountability."
 Freedom of Expression, Including for the Press"Non-governmental Impact: atheist, and lesbian, gay, bisexual, transgender, and intersex (LGBTI) writers and bloggers reported they continued to receive death threats from violent extremist organizations. In November, a human rights lawyer claimed he received death threats for writing about and advocating for the country’s LGBTI community."
 Acts of Violence, Discrimination, and Other Abuses Based on Sexual Orientation and Gender Identity"Consensual same-sex sexual activity is illegal under the law. LGBTI groups reported police used the law as a pretext to bully LGBTI individuals, as well as those considered effeminate regardless of their sexual orientation, and to limit registration of LGBTI organizations. Some groups also reported harassment under a suspicious behavior provision of the police code. The transgender population has long been a marginalized, but recognised part of society, but it faced continued high levels of fear, harassment, and law enforcement contact in the wake of violent extremist attacks against vulnerable communities. Members of LGBTI communities received threatening messages via telephone, text, and social media, and some were harassed by police. In May, RAB forces raided the Chayaneer Community Center in Keraniganj Upazila during a dinner organised by the LGBTI community from that area. According to witnesses, 28 individuals were arrested of the 120 persons present at the time of the raid. The witnesses also stated RAB separated the diners into small groups and beat them before identifying individuals for arrest. During the raid RAB announced to the media the raid was conducted based on suspicion of homosexual activity and allowed the media to photograph some of the arrested individuals. RAB later announced the attendees were not engaged in “illegal sexual activities” at the time of the raid and were instead arrested for possession of narcotics—specifically yaba (a combination of methamphetamine and caffeine) and cannabis. The court system remanded four of the individuals. Of the remaining 24 individuals, 12 were detained for further questioning and 12 were sent directly to jail. Following these events and continued harassment, many members of LGBTI communities, including the leadership of key support organizations, continued to reduce their activities and sought refuge both inside and outside of the country. This resulted in severely weakened advocacy and support networks for LGBTI persons. Organizations specifically assisting lesbians continued to be rare. Strong social stigma based on sexual orientation was common and prevented open discussion of the subject."
 HIV and AIDS Social Stigma"Social stigma against HIV and AIDS and against higher-risk populations could be a barrier for accessing health services, especially for the transgender community and men who have sex with men."
 Discrimination with Respect to Employment and Occupation"The labor law prohibits wage discrimination on the basis of sex or disability, but it does not prohibit other discrimination based on sex, disability, social status, caste, sexual orientation, or similar factors."

Summary table

See also

 Human rights in Bangladesh
 LGBT rights in Asia
 LGBT history in Bangladesh
 Sexuality in Bangladesh
 Male prostitution in Bangladesh

References

Human rights in Bangladesh
LGBT in Bangladesh
Bangladesh